St Alban-on-the-Moors Church, Splott, also known simply as The Cardiff Oratory or St Alban's Church, is a Roman Catholic church in Splott, Cardiff, Wales. Since 2019, the church is administered by the Fathers and Brothers of the Cardiff Oratory.

History

Original building
The initial church was an iron church finished in 1891, with parts from other churches (including Cardiff Metropolitan Cathedral and St Peter's Church). This was rebuilt as St Joseph's Church in Gabalfa when the new St Alban's building was finished.

Current building
The current building was designed by the Newport architect F. R. Bates.  The presbytery was completed later.

St Alban's became a Grade II listed building in 1997.

Cardiff Oratory 
In May 2019, the Archbishop of Cardiff transferred the administration of the Church and its parish from the Rosminians to the Cardiff Oratory. The priests there moved to St Peter's and St Joseph's, the two other Rosminian parishes in Cardiff.

Since the Oratorians' arrival, the Church has seen extensive restoration works, commensurate with the increase in attendance at Masses and other liturgies. The Oratorians have expanded the available Masses and devotions offered at the Church.

In May 2020, a wedding was held during a national COVID-19 pandemic lockdown, allegedly against Welsh Government guidance. It was also reported that the wedding was illegal because the required notice had not been given. In the end, no citations or other action were taken by police in response to allegations of violating government guidance.

In June 2021, in conjunction with the parish's patronal feast day, the Oratorians arranged for a first-class relic of St. Alban to be solemnly enshrined in the church by the Abbot of Farnborough.

Architecture 

The church is built in the Perpendicular Gothic style, using Pennant sandstone and Bath stone. Its towers are unusual, having both a central rectangular tower and a west octagonal tower. Construction was finished in 1911. The new building was officially opened on 16 July 1911.

The great west doors at the rear of the church lead to an enclosed porch. A baptistery chapel dedicated to the Divine Mercy is in the octagonal western tower.  At its entrance is a small shrine dedicated to Our Lady of Walsingham.

The lengthy nave is flanked by two aisles, between Gothic arches.  In the middle of the nave, two side chapels form significant features to both north and south: to the north, a large depiction of the Pieta sits within a chapel marked for mourning with purple and violet.  The northern chapel is framed by confessionals to the east and a reliquary chapel containing a shrine to Saint Alban with his first-class relics. Over the shrine are flags of the chivalrous confraternities associated with the Oratorians. In the south aisle, the Lady Chapel, featuring a Pugin-style altar and reredos and general Marian themes, can host daily Mass.  At the front of the nave, just before the crossing, are two shrines, with Gothic arched-niches set into the aisle walls, dedicated to St. Patrick in the north and St. Joseph in the south.  Throughout the aisles of the Nave are fourteen sculptures depicting the Way of the Cross from early twentieth century artisans.

The crossing features a large transept chapel to the south dedicated to the Sacred Heart and the pipe organ to the north.  Behind the organ is a small chapel dedicated to Our Lady of Perpetual Help, with an icon donated to the Oratorians by one of the Brothers of the Little Oratory.  Within the transept chapel is also a full-sized replica of the Shroud of Turin, which was a gift from the Archbishop of Turin to the Oratorians in 2020.

The sanctuary and quire are dominated by a large reredos and a huge stained-glass window, depicting the martyrdom of Saint Alban, the patron saint of the parish.  On both sides of the sanctuary are quire stalls for daily prayers. The sanctuary is marked off by a wrought-iron altar rail with gilding; the altar gates contain the arms of the parish and of the Oratorians.  The reredos is a composite of concrete and marble, with sculptures of cherubim, seraphim, archangels, and angels holding various liturgical implements. The twin focus of the reredos statuary are both the Tabernacle containing the reserved Blessed Sacrament and a window for the throne used during the Forty Hours' Devotion.

Liturgy 
In addition to the Usus Recentior form of the Mass, the Oratorians offer regular celebrations of the Usus Antiquior and the Ordinariate Use. Sung and solemn celebrations of the Divine Office are offered on every Sunday and solemnity. The Benediction of the Blessed Sacrament is celebrated six days each week, with a weekly High Mass on Sundays in English and in Latin.

References

External links 

 Cardiff Oratory
 British Listed Buildings

Roman Catholic churches in Cardiff
Oratorian communities in the United Kingdom
Grade II listed churches in Cardiff
Roman Catholic churches completed in 1911
Gothic Revival church buildings in Wales
1891 establishments in Wales